Cuthbert Butler  (born Edward Joseph Aloysius Butler; 6 May 1858 – 2 April 1934) was an Irish ecclesiastical historian much of whose career was spent as Benedictine of Downside Abbey in England. He was sometimes referred to as Dom Cuthbert Butler.

Butler is known for The Vatican Council: The Story from Inside in Bishop Ullathorne's Letters. Described by Michael J. G. Pahls as "[t]he standard [English-language] account of the First Vatican Council", the book is based on the correspondence of Bishop William Bernard Ullathorne of Birmingham. Gertrude Himmelfarb describes The Vatican Council as designed to support papal infallibility.

He also wrote on mysticism.

Early life
Edward Joseph Aloysius Butler was born on 6 May 1858 in Dublin, Ireland, to Edward Butler (1812-1902) and Mary (Cruise) Butler. His father was the first professor of mathematics at the Catholic University of Ireland, from 1854 to 1859, before and after that having worked for the Commission of National Education in Ireland. His mother came from a Norman Irish Catholic family and was a sister of the eminent consulting physician Sir Francis Cruise.

Butler was educated at Downside School, an English Benedictine school, from 1869 to 1875. During his time at the school, he was greatly influenced by the Benedictine priest William Petre who, along with the prior, Bernard Murphy, advised him as he discerned his vocation. As his parents did not want him to enter the Benedictine noviciate immediately after finishing at Downside, he spent a brief period at the short-lived Catholic University College in Kensington, London, as well as travelling throughout Europe.

Monastic life
Butler entered the noviciate at Belmont Abbey in Herefordshire in 1876. Reflecting on his entry into the abbey in a manuscript written between 1891 and 1892, he wrote:

He was ordained in 1884, the same year he got an MA from the University of London, under his birth name, and then became headmaster at Downside School.  In 1896 he moved to Cambridge, and soon thereafter he founded Benet House there for Benedictines attending that university.  He was a student at Christ's College there, now using the name Edward Cuthbert Butler, and was awarded BA 1898 and MA 1903. In 1906 he was elected Abbot of Downside Abbey, a post he held until his resignation in 1922.

He spent the rest of his life preaching in London and writing the books for which he is now remembered, in particular Western Mysticism (1922) and The Vatican Council (1930). He had earlier contributed dozens of articles to the 11th edition of the Encyclopedia Britannica (1911).

He died at his home in London on 2 April 1934.

Published works

References

Citations

Works cited

 
 
 
 
 
  Reprint of

Further reading

 
  Reprint of

External links

1858 births
1934 deaths
British historians
English Benedictines
19th-century English Roman Catholic priests
20th-century English Roman Catholic priests
English Roman Catholic writers
Historians of the Catholic Church
People educated at Downside School
Benedictine scholars
Abbots of Downside
Burials at Downside Abbey
Mysticism scholars